Börje Larsson (1910–1982) was a Swedish screenwriter and film director.  He was married to the screenwriter and costume designer Linda Larsson, who co-wrote three screenplays with him.

Selected filmography
 Two Men and a Widow (1933)
 It Pays to Advertise (1936)
 Shipwrecked Max (1936)
 The Ghost of Bragehus (1936)
 Unfriendly Relations (1936)
 Poor Millionaires (1936)
 Happy Vestköping (1937)
 Career (1938)
 Comrades in Uniform (1938)
 Tonight or Never (1941)
 Lärarinna på vift (1941)
 Poor Ferdinand (1941)
 It Is My Music (1942)
 Men of the Navy (1943)
 A Girl for Me (1943)
 The Green Lift (1944)
 Between Brothers (1946)
 The Saucepan Journey (1950)
 The Green Lift (1952)
 Taxi 13 (1954)
 Laugh Bomb (1954)
 Flicka i kasern (1955)
 The Dance Hall (1955)
 Åsa-Nisse på Mallorca (1962)
 Åsa-Nisse och tjocka släkten (1963)
 Sten Stensson Returns (1963)

References

Bibliography
 Gustafsson, Fredrik. The Man from the Third Row: Hasse Ekman, Swedish Cinema and the Long Shadow of Ingmar Bergman. Berghahn Books, 2016.
 Nelmes, Jill & Selbo, Jule. Women Screenwriters: An International Guide. Palgrave Macmillan, 2015.
 Wallengren, Ann-Kristin.  Welcome Home Mr Swanson: Swedish Emigrants and Swedishness on Film. Nordic Academic Press, 2014.

External links

1910 births
1982 deaths
Swedish film directors
Swedish screenwriters
People from Katrineholm Municipality